The Matthew Flinders Medal and Lecture of the Australian Academy of Science is awarded biennially to recognise exceptional research by Australian scientists in the physical sciences. Nominations can only be made by Academy Fellows.

Recipients
Source: Australian Academy of Science

See also 

 List of general science and technology awards 
 Prizes named after people

References

Australian science and technology awards
Awards established in 1957
Australian Academy of Science Awards